Yogesh Raj is a Nepali historian, scholar and writer. He won the Madan Puraskar for his novel Ranahar in 2018.

Biography 
He has a degree in mechanical engineering and a PhD in the history of science, technology, and medicine from Imperial College, London. He is a polyglot and speaks seven languages (Maithali, Nepali, English, Hindi, Bengali, Nepalbhasa and German).

In 2013, he wrote a book based on the death rituals of Hindu Newars titled Sandhya Samrachana: Hindu Newarharu ko Mrityu Chetana. He edited the jail diaries of the martyr Bharat Gopal Jha which was published as Uhi Jha: Euta Yuba Sahidko Antim Jail Diary (2018–2020) in 2017.

He published his first novel Ranahar in 2018. The novel is about the last king of Bhaktapur kingdom, Ranajit Malla. It won the Madan Puraskar for the same year.

Notable works 

Edited

 Ruptures and repairs in South Asia: historical perspectives (2013, Non-fiction, English)
 Uhi Jha: Euta Yuba Sahidko Antim Jail Diary (2018–2020) (Written by Bharat Gopal Jha, published 2017, Nepali)

See also 

 Chandra Prakash Baniya
 Pratyoush Onta

References 

21st-century Nepalese writers
Living people
21st-century Nepalese historians
Nepali-language writers from Nepal
English-language writers from Nepal
Nepalese academics
Alumni of Imperial College London
Year of birth missing (living people)